This is a list of species in Brachys, a genus of metallic wood-boring beetles in the family Buprestidae.

Brachys species

 Brachys acutus Kerremans, 1903 c g
 Brachys aequinoctialis Gory, 1841 c g
 Brachys aerosus (Melsheimer, 1845) i c g b
 Brachys aeruginosus Gory, 1841 i c g b
 Brachys alboundulatus Obenberger, 1937 c g
 Brachys amazonicus Kerremans, 1896 c g
 Brachys amphissus Obenberger, 1941 c g
 Brachys anthrenoides Waterhouse, 1889 c g
 Brachys apachei Knull, 1952 i c g b
 Brachys apicillus Obenberger, 1937 c g
 Brachys assimilatus Obenberger, 1922 c g
 Brachys aurulans Kerremans, 1896 c g
 Brachys barberi Fisher, 1924 i c g b
 Brachys bellus Fisher, 1922 c g
 Brachys bolivianus Obenberger, 1937 c g
 Brachys bruchi Kerremans, 1903 c g
 Brachys cantareirae Obenberger, 1923 c g
 Brachys capitatus Obenberger, 1934 c g
 Brachys carinellus Kerremans, 1896 c g
 Brachys carinicollis Kirsch, 1873 c g
 Brachys catharinae Obenberger, 1917 c g
 Brachys cayennensis Obenberger, 1937 c g
 Brachys cephalicus Schaeffer, 1909 i c g b
 Brachys coelestis Kerremans, 1897 c g
 Brachys coeruleifrons Obenberger, 1937 c g
 Brachys confusus Fisher, 1922 c g
 Brachys cordieri Obenberger, 1924 c g
 Brachys crassiceps Obenberger, 1937 c g
 Brachys cuprifrons Fisher, 1922 c g
 Brachys cuprinus Kerremans, 1897 c g
 Brachys cyaneoniger Kerremans, 1897 c g
 Brachys cyanicollis Kerremans, 1896 c g
 Brachys danae Obenberger, 1941 c g
 Brachys delicatulus Obenberger, 1923 c g
 Brachys deliciosus Obenberger, 1923 c g
 Brachys depressus Kerremans, 1903 c g
 Brachys dimidiatus Waterhouse, 1889 c g
 Brachys distinctus Waterhouse, 1889 c g
 Brachys elegans Fisher, 1922 c g
 Brachys exquisitus Hespenheide *in* Westcott, *et al*., 2008 c g
 Brachys fasciatus Kerremans, 1896 c g
 Brachys fasciferus Schwarz, 1878 i c g b
 Brachys festivus Kerremans, 1899 c g
 Brachys fleischeri Obenberger, 1937 c g
 Brachys floccosus Mannerheim, 1837 i c g b
 Brachys floricola Kerremans, 1900 c g
 Brachys fluviatillis Obenberger, 1937 c g
 Brachys frontalis Kerremans, 1896 c g
 Brachys fulgidus Fisher, 1922 c g
 Brachys fulvus Kerremans, 1897 c g
 Brachys gebhardti Obenberger, 1937 c g
 Brachys glabromaculatus Obenberger, 1937 c g
 Brachys gounellei Kerremans, 1897 c g
 Brachys granulicollis Obenberger, 1941 c g
 Brachys gregori Obenberger, 1937 c g
 Brachys guatemalensis Obenberger, 1937 c g
 Brachys guttulatus Mannerheim, 1837 c g
 Brachys hexagonalis Dugès, 1891 c g
 Brachys hintoni Fisher, 1933 c g
 Brachys hofferi Obenberger, 1937 c g
 Brachys howdeni  b
 Brachys humeralis Kerremans, 1897 c g
 Brachys imperatrix Obenberger, 1937 c g
 Brachys incolus Obenberger, 1923 c g
 Brachys ineditus Kerremans, 1896 c g
 Brachys ingae Kogan, 1964 c g
 Brachys insignis Kerremans, 1899 c g
 Brachys intervallorum Hespenheide, 1990 c g
 Brachys jakobsoni Obenberger, 1937 c g
 Brachys jalapae Obenberger, 1937 c g
 Brachys kleinei Obenberger, 1939 c g
 Brachys kratochvili Obenberger, 1937 c g
 Brachys laetus Waterhouse, 1889 c g
 Brachys latipennis Obenberger, 1923 c g
 Brachys lebasii Gory & Laporte, 1840 c g
 Brachys lineatus Kerremans, 1897 c g
 Brachys lineifrons Fisher, 1933 c g
 Brachys lineiger Kerremans, 1899 c g
 Brachys luteosignatus Obenberger, 1937 c g
 Brachys marialicae Cazier, 1951 c g
 Brachys marmoreus Kerremans, 1903 c g
 Brachys mirabilis Kerremans, 1899 c g
 Brachys mositanus Fisher, 1925 c g
 Brachys mrazi Obenberger, 1923 c g
 Brachys mutabilis Gory, 1841 c g
 Brachys nevermanni Fisher, 1929 c g
 Brachys nigricans Kerremans, 1897 c g
 Brachys nigrofasciatus Kerremans, 1896 c g
 Brachys nigroviridis Fisher, 1922 c g
 Brachys nodifer Kerremans, 1903 c g
 Brachys nodosus Kerremans, 1897 c g
 Brachys obscurus Gory, 1841 c g
 Brachys occidentalis Obenberger, 1923 c g
 Brachys ornatus Fisher, 1922 c g
 Brachys ovatus (Weber, 1801) i c g b
 Brachys palaeno Obenberger, 1941 c g
 Brachys paraguayensis Obenberger, 1923 c g
 Brachys paulensis Obenberger, 1923 c g
 Brachys pauligenus Obenberger, 1937 c g
 Brachys pedicularius Gory, 1841 c g
 Brachys pictus Kerremans, 1897 c g
 Brachys pilosus Fisher, 1922 c g
 Brachys planticolus Obenberger, 1937 c g
 Brachys planus Gory, 1841 c g
 Brachys pretiosus Kerremans, 1897 c g
 Brachys pulverosus Waterhouse, 1889 c g
 Brachys purpuratus Kerremans, 1897 c g
 Brachys pusillus Obenberger, 1923 c g
 Brachys querci Knull, 1952 i c g b
 Brachys regularis Thomson, 1878 c g
 Brachys rileyi  b
 Brachys robustus Hespenheide, 1990 c g
 Brachys roseifasciatus Obenberger, 1923 c g
 Brachys rudis Kerremans, 1896 c g
 Brachys rugosulus Obenberger, 1923 c g
 Brachys sanctus Obenberger, 1937 c g
 Brachys scapulosus Chevrolat, 1838 c g
 Brachys schmidti Obenberger, 1939 c g
 Brachys scintillus Obenberger, 1923 c g
 Brachys simiolus Obenberger, 1923 c g
 Brachys simoni Kerremans, 1896 c g
 Brachys simplex Waterhouse, 1889 c g
 Brachys speculiferus Obenberger, 1941 c g
 Brachys strandi Obenberger, 1937 c g
 Brachys suavis Kerremans, 1900 c g
 Brachys taciturnus Kerremans, 1900 c g
 Brachys takanus Fisher, 1925 c g
 Brachys tesselatus (Fabricius, 1801) i c g
 Brachys thomae Fisher, 1925 c g
 Brachys tovaricus Kerremans, 1896 c g
 Brachys transversus Kerremans, 1899 c g
 Brachys triangularis Thomson, 1879 c g
 Brachys tricinctus (Fabricius, 1801) c g
 Brachys tuberculifer Kerremans, 1896 c g
 Brachys valkai Obenberger, 1923 c g
 Brachys varicolor Gory & Laporte, 1840 c g
 Brachys vicinus Kerremans, 1903 c g
 Brachys virgo Obenberger, 1941 c g
 Brachys viridans Kerremans, 1896 c g
 Brachys zavadili Obenberger, 1937 c g
 Brachys zavreli Obenberger, 1937 c g
 Brachys zeteki Fisher, 1933 c g
 Brachys zikani Obenberger, 1923 c g
 Brachys zonalis Kerremans, 1897 c g

Data sources: i = ITIS, c = Catalogue of Life, g = GBIF, b = Bugguide.net

References

Brachys